The A. E. Doyle Cottage is a historic house in Neahkahnie Beach, Oregon, United States. It was designed by American architect A. E. Doyle.

The cottage was listed on the National Register of Historic Places in 1991.

See also
National Register of Historic Places listings in Tillamook County, Oregon

References

External links
Images at Oregon Digital, University of Oregon Libraries

National Register of Historic Places in Tillamook County, Oregon
Houses completed in 1915
Arts and Crafts architecture in Oregon
1915 establishments in Oregon
A. E. Doyle buildings
1910s architecture in the United States